See also McClintock (disambiguation)

McLintock! is a 1963 American Western comedy film, starring John Wayne and Maureen O'Hara, directed by Andrew V. McLaglen. The film co-stars Wayne's son Patrick Wayne, Stefanie Powers, Jack Kruschen, Chill Wills, and Yvonne DeCarlo (billed as special guest star). Loosely based on William Shakespeare's The Taming of the Shrew, the project was filmed in Technicolor and Panavision, and produced by Wayne's company, Batjac Productions.

In 1991, the film entered the public domain in the United States because the claimants did not renew its copyright registration in the 28th year after publication.

Plot

 
 
Tough cattle baron and town namesake George Washington "G.W." McLintock lives as a bachelor on his ranch. His wife, Katherine "Kate" McLintock, abandoned him with no explanation and become a socialite out East two years prior; his daughter, Rebecca "Becky" McLintock, is away finishing her college degree. In the town, G.W. is disliked by local bureaucrat Matt Douglas, and territorial Governor Cuthbert H. Humphrey. However, he is a friend to many, including Sheriff Lord, General Store owner Jake Birnbaum, and the local populations of beggars and Comanche Indians.

G.W. addresses a group of homesteaders, warning them that the land is likely unsuitable for farming. Devlin "Dev" Warren, a young man with a mother and sister to support, asks G.W. for a job. G.W. initially refuses; egged on by aged drifter Bunny, Dev resorts to begging, then lashes out in frustration when G.W. relents. However, G.W. still hires him. He also hires Dev's widowed mother Mrs. Warren, after tasting her cooking. G.W. then learns Kate is in town; she tells him she wants a divorce, so she can take Becky back East with her, but G.W. refuses. Kate then decides to move back into the ranch, and starts bossing everyone around, immediately targeting Mrs. Warren.

The Comanche come into town to meet a train, and Sheriff Lord settles them near the homesteaders. When a homesteader's daughter wanders off with her lover, Douglas and the homesteaders assume the Comanche took her and attempt to lynch Running Buffalo in retaliation. G.W. and his men arrive to try to defuse the situation, and a huge and muddy brawl ensues, with Kate unexpectedly joining in on G.W.'s side. Later, Becky arrives home from college with a suitor, Douglas' son "Junior". G.W. disapproves of Junior, so Kate makes a show of approving. In the back of Becky's train are four Comanche chiefs, who have arrived for a hearing to determine whether or not their people will be sent to a reservation in Fort Sill, Oklahoma. G.W. agrees to speak at the hearing on their behalf. 

While getting ready for Becky's welcome-home party, Dev and Becky get into an argument when he accuses Junior of being a "Dude". At the party, Dev gets into a fistfight to protect Birnbaum's young assistant Davy, and impresses everyone with his boxing skills. Some time later, after being deliberately taunted by Becky and Junior, Dev accuses Becky of being a "trollop" for kissing Junior before they were properly engaged. Becky demands G.W. shoot Dev for insulting her; G.W. "shoots" him with a starter's pistol to teach Becky a lesson, and allows Dev to spank Becky with a coal shovel, angering Kate.

At the hearing, G.W. delivers a passionate plea from the Comanche to Governor Humphrey, but is ignored. The Comanche are ordered to be imprisoned until they can be sent to Fort Sill. Getting drunk that night, G.W. suggests to Bunny that, if the Comanche were to go out fighting as they requested, the Government might realize Humphrey's mismanagement of the territory and intervene. G.W. returns home and pressures Mrs. Warren into drinking with him; both of them fall down the stairs, and Kate assumes the worst when she sees Mrs. Warren on G.W.'s lap, until Mrs. Warren explains she is quitting because Sheriff Lord has asked her to marry him. 

At the Fourth of July celebrations the next day, Kate sternly refuses Humphrey's advances, but continues to treat her husband harshly. Bunny, who took G.W. seriously, helps set the Comanches free; they charge through town on their way to fight the U.S Army, causing everyone to scatter and hide. While hiding in a haystack, Dev and Becky reconcile, and become engaged. Encouraged by this, and advice from Birnbaum, G.W. confronts Kate, getting her to admit that she left because she found lipstick on his shirt and incorrectly assumed he was having an affair. After pursuing her through town and spanking her, G.W. tells Kate she is free to divorce him, and leaves for home. However, she follows him, and the two finally reconcile.

Cast

 John Wayne as George Washington "G.W." McLintock
 Maureen O'Hara as Katherine "Kate" McLintock
 Patrick Wayne as Devlin "Dev" Warren
 Stefanie Powers as Rebecca "Becky" McLintock
 Jack Kruschen as Jake Birnbaum
 Chill Wills as Drago
 Yvonne De Carlo as Louise Warren
 Jerry Van Dyke as Matt Douglas Jr.
 Edgar Buchanan as Bunny Dull
 Perry Lopez as Davey Elk
 Strother Martin as Agard
 Gordon Jones as Matt Douglas
 Robert Lowery as Gov. Cuthbert H. Humphrey 
 Hank Worden as Curly Fletcher
 Michael Pate as Puma, Chief of the Comanche Nation
 Bruce Cabot as Ben Sage, Sr.
 Edward Faulkner as Ben Sage, Jr.
 Mari Blanchard as Camille
 Leo Gordon as Jones
 Chuck Roberson as Sheriff Jeff Lord
 Bob Steele as Train Engineer
 Aissa Wayne as Alice Warren
 "Big" John Hamilton as Fauntleroy Sage
 H.W. Gim as Ching

Production
The script was developed by John Wayne as a way for him to express his disapproval for how Westerns negatively represent Native Americans, his opinions on marital abuse, and discontent for political corruption from either party; intentionally contrasting previous films in which Wayne starred but had little creative-control, such as John Ford's The Searchers. Another sharp contrast from previous films of Wayne is the emphasis on comedy, and using the Western setting for slapstick possibilities. He offered the job of directing to Andrew McLaglen, son to Wayne's longtime co-star Victor McLaglen, who had directed a number of low-budget features and had worked widely in television. It was the first movie fully produced by Wayne's son, Michael, although Michael Wayne had worked on a number of other films in various capacities. The male juvenile lead was John Wayne's younger son, Patrick.

The film was shot at Old Tucson Studios, west of Tucson, Arizona, and at San Rafael Ranch House - San Rafael State Natural Area, south of Patagonia, Arizona, and Nogales. Although the name of the territory is never mentioned, and the Mesa Verde region where the film is set is located predominantly in Colorado, New Mexico, and Utah, in the court scene, the flag of Arizona is seen alongside the U.S. flag, although the flag of Arizona was not created until 1917.

Many of the cast and crew, notably Andrew McLaglen, William H. Clothier, Bruce Cabot, Chill Wills, Edward Faulkner, Hank Worden, Strother Martin, and Maureen O'Hara, had worked with Wayne on other productions. Wayne insisted a supporting role be given to Yvonne de Carlo, whose husband had been injured making How the West Was Won. Michael Wayne estimated the budget as being $3.5 to $4.0 million.

As in many other John Wayne films, Wayne is wearing his favorite "Red River D" belt buckle. It can be best seen in the scene where G.W. addresses the homesteaders about 10 minutes into the film, and at the end of the scene where the Comanche ride through town on the way to "the last fight of the Comanche," around 10 minutes from the end of the movie.

In the DVD Special Feature "Maureen O'Hara and Stefanie Powers Remember McLintock!", O'Hara reported that when  Wayne and she filmed the famous scene in which he spanked her with a coal scuttle shovel, he did not pull his strokes. "He really spanked me! My bottom was black and blue for weeks!"

Music

"Love in the Country" sung by The Limeliters
Music coordinator: "By" Dunham
"Love in the Country" words and music by "By" Dunham and Frank DeVol
"Just Right for Me", "Cakewalk", "When We Dance" words and music by "By" Dunham

Reception
The film was a box-office success, and a timely one, since The Alamo had cost Wayne in both financial and "box-office capital" terms. McLintock! grossed $14,500,000 in North America, earning $7.25 million in US theatrical rentals.

Andrew McLaglen said the film "put me in the big time." He made four more films with Wayne: Hellfighters (1968), The Undefeated (1969), Chisum (1970), and Cahill, U.S. Marshal (1973).

According to Bosley Crowther, "the broadly comic Western ... sounded like a promising idea"; "the scenery is opulent and the action out-of-doors, the color lush, and the cast made up almost entirely of recruits from John Ford's long cinematic cycle commemorating the tradition of the American frontier." Since "the direction was entrusted to a relative newcomer, Victor McLaglen's television-trained son, Andrew V. McLaglen ... good intentions, when the task at hand is as difficult as lusty farce, are not enough."  Emanuel Levy, in a review years after the film's release, said the film is "significant because it marks the beginning of Wayne's attempt to impose his general views, not just political ones, on his pictures. Most of Wayne's screen work after McLintock! would express his opinions about education, family, economics, and even friendship."

Novelization
Richard Wormser wrote a novelization of the screenplay.

Public domain status
The film was produced by John Wayne's Batjac Productions and released through United Artists. Batjac failed to renew the copyright, which expired in 1991. In 1994, a legal case determined the film was in the public domain in the United States, but the music score remained under copyright.

Batjac Productions, a company now owned by John Wayne's estate, retains distribution rights for "officially restored" versions of the film and holds the original film negatives, as well as rights to the film's musical score.

Video releases
Despite being available in the public domain by various distributors for the past decade (including GoodTimes Home Video and Simitar Entertainment), the first official home video issue of the film was released in the mid-1990s by MPI Home Video. In 2005, Paramount Home Media Distribution struck a distribution deal with Batjac (which owns the original film negatives) and was granted exclusive distribution rights for an official remastered release debuting on DVD in 2005. This "official" DVD release uses a restoration made from the original camera negative, under license from Batjac, with a newly created 5.1 surround mix and the original monoaural. Bonus features include a new extensive documentary, a "2 Minute Fight School" featurette, photo and trailer galleries, and an audio commentary with Leonard Maltin, Frank Thompson, Maureen O’Hara, Stefanie Powers, Michael Pate, Michael Wayne, and Andrew McLaglen. In spite of this licensed release, numerous versions of the film are still being released by other companies, with most using old TV prints and film elements outside of Batjac's official restoration.

Olive Films released a bare-bones Blu-Ray in March 2013, using a 2012 2K scan of a 35-mm Technicolor element with the original monoaural track. Olive's release had no involvement from Batjac Productions, as the 2K restoration was provided by the Library of Congress and is classified as public domain, whereas the "official" restoration is copyrighted to Batjac with Paramount handling exclusive distribution.

Paramount followed up in May 2014 with their Blu-Ray release, under license from Batjac Productions. This release uses a brand new 4K remaster from the original camera negative with Dolby TrueHD 5.1 surround and original mono. It also carries over all the bonus features from the previous Paramount DVD, with the only new addition of the original theatrical trailer scanned in 2K from a 35-mm element.

Comic-book adaption
 Gold Key: McLintock! (March 1964)

See also
 List of American films of 1963
 John Wayne filmography

References

External links

 
 
 
 
 
  (also widescreen version)

1963 films
1963 Western (genre) films
1960s Western (genre) comedy films
American Western (genre) comedy films
Batjac Productions films
1960s English-language films
Films scored by Frank De Vol
Films based on The Taming of the Shrew
Films directed by Andrew McLaglen
Films produced by John Wayne
Films shot in Arizona
United Artists films
Films adapted into comics
1960s American films